Jérémy Mellot (born 28 March 1994) is a French professional footballer who plays as a right back for Spanish club CD Tenerife.

Club career
In June 2019, Mellot signed with En Avant de Guingamp after being named full-back of the season for Rodez AF. He made his professional debut with Guingamp in a 3–3 Ligue 2 tie with Grenoble Foot 38 on 26 July 2019, scoring the opening goal on his debut.

On 27 June 2021, Mellot moved abroad and signed a two-year deal with Segunda División side CD Tenerife.

References

External links
 
 

1994 births
Living people
Sportspeople from Clermont-Ferrand
French footballers
Association football fullbacks
En Avant Guingamp players
Rodez AF players
Ligue 2 players
Championnat National players
Championnat National 2 players
Championnat National 3 players
CD Tenerife players
French expatriate footballers
French expatriate sportspeople in Spain
Expatriate footballers in Spain
Footballers from Auvergne-Rhône-Alpes